Pastil, or pastel, is a Filipino packed rice dish made with steamed rice wrapped in banana leaves with dry shredded beef, chicken, or fish. It originates from the Maguindanao people and is a popular, cheap breakfast meal in Mindanao, especially among Muslim Filipinos. Pastil is also known as patil, patel, patir, or pater in Maranao; and paster in Iranun.

Pastil is also the Tausūg name for a type of empanada, an unrelated pastry made with beansprout and glass noodle fillings mostly popular in Zamboanga City.

Description
The meat or fish component of the dish is known as the kagikit. It is usually shredded beef or chicken. The meat is cooked similar to adobo. It is first boiled until tender, then allowed to cool before shredding them into little strips. Garlic and onions are sautéed in a pan and the shredded meat added after the onions turn transparent. Soy sauce (or oyster sauce), black pepper, labuyo chilis, and salt to taste are added and allowed to simmer until they evaporate. Shredded grilled fish can also be used; usually katipa (walking catfish) or dalag (common snakehead).

The white rice is mixed with a little bit of glutinous rice so it can maintain its shape. The mixture is steamed normally. The banana leaves are wilted over an open flame to make them pliable, then the inside surfaces are slathered with oil. The rice is then placed on the leaves shaped as a thick cylinder with a strip of the meat filling extending along the length of the rice or covering one side of the rice. The leaf is then wrapped around the mixture with the ends tucked inside.

Pastil is traditionally served with vegetables soaked in vinegar as a side dish, like cucumber or togue (mung bean sprouts), to neutralize the saltiness of the kagikit. A hard-boiled egg may also be included to complement the meal. It is usually eaten with coffee or sikulate (hot chocolate) for breakfast or for merienda. Pastil are commonly sold by restaurants and street vendors in Muslim communities in Mindanao and throughout the islands, for example, General Santos hosts several restaurants serving this with side dishes, while in Taguig, they sell this as a cheap snack.

Similar dishes
Pastil is similar to the northern Filipino meat binalot dishes, but it differs in that it uses shredded meat or fish fillings, rather than regular meat dishes.

See also
Panyalam
Piyoso
Suman
Tiyula itum

References

Rice dishes
Philippine rice dishes
Beef dishes